RMS Connaught was a steamship built in 1897 and operated by the City of Dublin Steam Packet Company for Royal Mail as well as passenger service. Connaught was the second ship of this name operated by the line. She was torpedoed and sunk by German submarine  on 3 March 1917.

History

In 1897, the line was awarded an additional 21 years for their contract with the Post Office, and so they ordered four replacement ships from Laird's of Birkenhead, which were to carry the same names as the former ships. 

With the First World War in progress, Connaught was commandeered in 1915 by the British War Office and was employed as a troopship. Having transported troops the previous evening, on 3 March 1917, Connaught was returning to Southampton from Le Havre. At about 13:45, submarine U-48 fired a torpedo which exploded aft on the starboard side. The ship's wireless was disabled, so an S.O.S. could not be sent. 15 minutes later, a second torpedo struck amidships on the port side. Three crewmen having been killed, the rest of the crew took to the lifeboats. Connaught sank within four minutes of the second torpedo striking.

References

Ships List
Appendices 6 & 7 in Torpedoed! The R.M.S. Leinster Disaster by Philip Lecane, Periscope Publishing Ltd, Cornwall 2005.
U-Boat Alley by Roy Stokes, published by Compuwreck, 
Anglesey-Môn Info Web

Steamships of the United Kingdom
Ships sunk by German submarines in World War I
Ships built on the River Mersey
World War I passenger ships of the United Kingdom
World War I shipwrecks in the Irish Sea
Maritime incidents in 1917